Titouan Carod (born 1 April 1994 in Die) is a French cyclist, who specializes in cross-country mountain biking.

Major results

2012
 1st  Cross-country, National Junior Championships
 2nd  Cross-country, UEC European Junior Championships
 3rd  Cross-country, UCI World Junior Championships
2014
 3rd Cross-country, National Under-23 Championships
2015
 1st  Cross-country, National Under-23 Championships
 1st  Overall UCI Under-23 World Cup
1st Mont-Sainte-Anne
2nd Lenzerheide
2nd Windham
2nd Val di Sole
2016
 1st  Overall UCI Under-23 World Cup
1st La Bresse
1st Lenzerheide
1st Mont-Sainte-Anne
2nd Albstadt
3rd Cairns
3rd Vallnord
 2nd  Cross-country, UEC European Under-23 Championships
 2nd Cross-country, National Under-23 Championships
2017
 Swiss Bike Cup
1st Lugano
3rd Rivera
 2nd Cross-country, National Championships
2018
 1st  Cross-country, National Championships
 French Cup
1st Ussel
2nd Marseille
 Swiss Bike Cup
1st Monte Tamaro
3rd Lugano
 UCI XCO World Cup
3rd Mont-Sainte-Anne
2019
 French Cup
1st Levens
 UCI XCC World Cup
2nd Snowshoe
 Swiss Bike Cup
2nd Monte Tamaro
 3rd Cross-country, National Championships
2020
 2nd  Cross-country, UEC European Championships
 2nd Cross-country, National Championships
 3rd  Cross-country, UCI World Championships
2021
 French Cup
1st Ussel
2nd Marseille
 Swiss Bike Cup
2nd Leukerbad
 Copa Catalana Internacional
2nd Girona
 3rd Cross-country, National Championships
2022
 1st  Cross-country, National Championships
 2nd Overall UCI XCO World Cup
1st Mont-Sainte-Anne
1st Val di Sole
2nd Snowshoe
 3rd Overall UCI XCC World Cup
1st Val di Sole
 French Cup
1st Marseille
1st Le Bessat
 Copa Catalana Internacional
1st Banyoles
2023
 Shimano Super Cup Massi
3rd Banyoles

References

1994 births
Living people
French male cyclists
Université Savoie-Mont Blanc alumni